Legislative Order ( or Besluitwet, literally translated in English as law-order) in Belgium refers to laws adopted by the Belgian Government during the First and the Second World War, when the Belgian Parliament was unable to meet.

Belgian legislation
Belgium in World War I
Belgium in World War II